Hervieu may refer to:

  (1840- ?) French personality at the origin of several social innovations
 Paul Hervieu (1857-1915), French dramatist and novelist
 Louise Hervieu (1878-1954), French writer, artist, painter, draftsman, and lithographer
 Danièle Hervieu-Léger (1947-), French sociologist
  (1948-), French agronomist
 Francis Hervieu (1956-), French sprint canoer
  (1963-), French dancer and choreographer